Günter Graulich (born 2 July 1926) is a German church musician and music publisher.

Life and work 
Born in Stuttgart, after his studies Graulich worked as a teacher and church music director at the protestant Matthäuskirche in Stuttgart. Graulich had special importance by his extensive editing activity of works of church music. One of his main focuses was the Stuttgart Schütz Edition with works by Heinrich Schütz, which strongly meets practical performance needs. In 1972 he founded the Carus-Verlag with his wife Waltraud.

Honours 
 2009: Order of Merit of the Federal Republic of Germany

References

Further reading 
 Marja von Bargen et al. (edit.): Günter Graulich. Chorleiter und Musikverleger. Festschrift zum 90. Geburtstag.  Carus, Stuttgart 2016, .
 Renate und Volker Osteneck, Ulrike-Christiane Bauschert (edit.): 50 Jahre Motettenchor Stuttgart unter Günter Graulich. 1951–2001, fünf Jahrzehnte Chormusik. Festschrift zum Jubiläum.  Carus, Stuttgart 2001, .

External links 
 Motettenchor Stuttgart
 Günter Graulich by Carus-Verlag
 

German choral conductors
German music publishers (people)
Officers Crosses of the Order of Merit of the Federal Republic of Germany
1926 births
Living people
Musicians from Stuttgart
Kirchenmusikdirektor